The Seoudi Group is an Egyptian automobile manufacturer which was founded in 1975 with its current head office in Cairo.

In the 1970s Seoudi Group began to import Suzuki commercial vehicles.  By the 1990s the company was assembling Suzuki vehicles and manufacturing car seats and radiators, and was the sole importers of Nissan vehicles. The company also began its work with the Modern Motors S.A.E. which is specialized for manufacturing Nissan vehicles. From 1997 to 1999 the Modern Motors production plant was the first BMW producing company in Egypt followed by the ACVA joint-venture.

In 1981 the company founded its second company called El-Mashreq Company and was now called a group.  El-Mashreq Company is car importer for vehicles of the Italian brands Fiat and Alfa Romeo.

The third assembly plant was opened in 1988. The plant is located in the 6th of October City and specialized for manufacturing Suzuki and Lada vehicles.

References

External links 
Official Website of the Seoudi Group

Car manufacturers of Egypt
Vehicle manufacturing companies established in 1975
Manufacturing companies based in Cairo
Alfa Romeo
BMW
Fiat
AvtoVAZ
Nissan
Suzuki
Egyptian companies established in 1975